The Independent Order of Odd Fellows-Lodge No. 189 Building, in Marinette, Wisconsin, was built in 1887.  It was listed on the National Register of Historic Places in 1999.  It served historically as a meeting hall and as a restaurant.

It's a two-story cream-city brick commercial building with stone and brick details. It has a shed roof behind a modest projecting parapet. Its second story has six bays;  its first floor historically was three storefronts divided by two-story brick piers.

References

Buildings and structures in Marinette County, Wisconsin
Clubhouses on the National Register of Historic Places in Wisconsin
Odd Fellows buildings in Wisconsin
National Register of Historic Places in Marinette County, Wisconsin
1887 establishments in Wisconsin
Buildings and structures completed in 1887